Brad Gwilliam (born 8 September, 1966) is a former Australian rules footballer who played with the West Coast Eagles and Richmond in the Australian Football League (AFL).

Gwilliam was picked up by West Coast with the last selection of the 1989 VFL Draft, one of three additional draft picks the club has been given. He appeared in the first three games of the 1990 AFL season but didn't play again until round 16. He remained on the list during 1991 but did not play for at the senior level. 

He went to Richmond in 1992, through the pre-season draft after being delisted from West Coast, and was their full-back for four games early in the year. In the fourth, against Adelaide at Football Park, he badly injured his knee in a collision with a goalpost and never played another AFL match.

References

1966 births
Australian rules footballers from Western Australia
West Coast Eagles players
Richmond Football Club players
West Perth Football Club players
Living people